The Cammeraygal, variously spelled as Cam-mer-ray-gal, Gamaraigal, Kameraigal, Cameragal and several other variations, are one clan of the 29 Darug tribes who are united by a common language, strong ties of kinship and survived as skilled hunter–fisher–gatherers in family groups or clans that inhabited the Lower North Shore of Sydney, New South Wales, Australia.

Traditional lands
The traditional lands of the Cammeraygal people are now contained within much of the North Sydney, Willoughby, Mosman, Manly and Warringah local government areas. The Cammeraygal people lived in the area until the 1820s and are recorded as being in the northern parts of the Sydney region for approximately 5,800 years.

Legacy
The name Cammeraygal is ensigned on the North Sydney Municipal emblem. The North Sydney suburb of Cammeray and the Cammeraygal High School located in the North Sydney suburb of Crows Nest are named after the Cammeraygal people. In 1999, the North Sydney Council erected a monument in honour of the Cammeraygal tribe who are the traditional owners of the North Sydney area.

Notable Cammeraygal people
 Barangaroo, the second wife of Bennelong

See also

 List of Indigenous Australian group names

Notes

Citations

Sources

Eora
History of Sydney